Jag har inte tid is a 1984 studio album by Sten & Stanley.

Track listing
Auf wiederseh'n Cherie
Wiktoria (Drömmaren på berget)
Till sist (Danach)
Amore amore
Låt mej få veta vem du är (Ich will nicht weissen)
Tre små ord
Törnfåglarna (The Thorn Birds)
Jag har inte tid
Det blir morgon (Serenata)
Två människor (Wodu bist)
Fri som en vind (Free Like a Bird)
Ställ dej sist i kön
Det händer aldrig igen (Never Never)
Ett sjumastat skepp (Ein schneeweisses Schiff)

Charts

References 

1984 albums
Sten & Stanley albums